Kaj Österberg (born 8 December 1942) is a Finnish footballer. He played in four matches for the Finland national football team in 1964.

References

External links
 

1942 births
Living people
Finnish footballers
Finland international footballers
Place of birth missing (living people)
Association footballers not categorized by position
Finnish football managers
Finland women's national football team managers